Genzsch & Heyse was a German type foundry established in Hamburg.  In the 1920s and 1930s, G+H types were sold in the United States by Continental Type Founders Association.

Typefaces

The following foundry types were issued by the Trennert Type Foundry:

References

Letterpress font foundries of Germany
Manufacturing companies based in Hamburg